Jane Elliot (born January 17, 1947)is an American actress, best known for her role as Tracy Quartermaine in the ABC daytime soap opera, General Hospital.

Career
Elliot appeared in a number of episodic prime time television series, such as The Mod Squad, Kojak, Barnaby Jones and Police Woman. She had a lead role in the short-lived NBC series Rosetti and Ryan in 1977.

Elliot also made film appearances, including Change of Habit (1969); opposite Elvis Presley, Mary Tyler Moore, and Barbara McNair; and One Is a Lonely Number (1972). In 1987, Elliot appeared in the films Some Kind of Wonderful and Baby Boom.

Daytime roles 
Elliot made her daytime debut in the short-lived ABC soap A Flame in the Wind in 1965. She is best known for her role as Tracy Quartermaine on the ABC daytime soap opera General Hospital. Elliot debuted as Tracy in 1978 and became a fan favorite. Her first stint included a scene which underscored Tracy's ruthlessness, where Tracy withholds her father's heart medication when he appears to be suffering a heart attack. Elliot left in 1980 and won a Daytime Emmy Award for Outstanding Supporting Actress in a Drama Series for the role in 1981. The same year, she landed the recurring role of Judy Trent on the prime time CBS series Knots Landing.

From 1981 to 1982, Elliot appeared on the CBS soap opera Guiding Light as Carrie Todd, a character who was involved with Ross Marler; Ross learns that Carrie is a murderer and has a split personality. Elliot considers her time as Carrie as one of her favorite roles, saying "the most was asked of me when I was doing that role."

From 1984 to 1986 she played Cynthia Chandler Preston Cortlandt on All My Children. Cynthia seduced wealthy, older Palmer Cortlandt, broke up Palmer and Daisy's marriage and married Palmer, while sleeping with Ross Chandler.

In 1986 producer Gail Kobe contacted Elliot, to offer her the role of Stephanie Douglas Forrester on the newly created CBS soap opera The Bold and the Beautiful. Elliot accepted the role, but on Christmas Eve 1986, Kobe called Elliot to tell her that Susan Flannery was returning to daytime as Stephanie, and creator Bill Bell had given Flannery the part instead.

Elliot next appeared on daytime as Anjelica Deveraux on Days of Our Lives from 1987 to 1989. Although married to Harper Deveraux (played by Joseph Campanella), Anjelica has an affair with the much younger Justin Kiriakis (played by Wally Kurth), and becomes pregnant with his child. Complications ensue when Anjelica discovers that Harper is sterile, and has always known about it. Elliot played the part of Anjelica for two years, with the character being involved in many additional complications and intrigues. 

After leaving Days of Our Lives, she returned to General Hospital in 1989, and in 1991 was reunited with Kurth, who was cast as Tracy's son, Ned Ashton. Elliot left again in mid-1993, later becoming a producer on the 1995 ABC soap opera The City. From 1996 to 1997 she reprised the role of Tracy Quartermaine on The City after briefly appearing as Tracy again on General Hospital. In 2003, Elliot returned to General Hospital as a regular cast member. In 2014, she was nominated for another Daytime Emmy Award for Outstanding Supporting Actress in a Drama Series, 33 years after her win and 21 years since her last nomination. Elliot announced her retirement in March 2017.

In November 2019, it was announced that she would be returning to General Hospital in December 2019.
She has made several short-term appearances since; the character of Tracy's appearances have primarily been written as holiday visits.

Filmography

References

External links

Living people
American film actresses
American soap opera actresses
American television actresses
Daytime Emmy Award winners
Daytime Emmy Award for Outstanding Supporting Actress in a Drama Series winners
Actors from Manhattan Beach, California
Actresses from New York City
21st-century American women
Year of birth missing (living people)